Poniatowa  is a town in southeastern Poland, in Opole Lubelskie County, in Lublin Voivodship, with 10,500 inhabitants (2006). It belongs to the historic province of Lesser Poland. During the existence of the 17th-century Polish–Lithuanian Commonwealth Poniatowa was part of the Lublin Voivodeship also. For most of its history Poniatowa was a village; it did not receive town charter until July 18, 1962. The town has a sports club Stal, established in 1951.

History
Exact date of establishment of Poniatowa is not known, however, it must have existed before the year 1382, because on September 2, 1382, the Starosta of Lublin issued a document co-signed by a man named Gotard, who was the owner of a village named Poniatowa. In the late Middle Ages, the Land of Lublin was located in eastern part of the Kingdom of Poland, near the border with Grand Duchy of Lithuania and Eastern Slavic lands. After King Kazimierz Wielki annexed Red Ruthenia into Poland (1340s), the region became populated with settlers from other parts of Lesser Poland. In the 15th century, some 178 new villages were founded in the Land of Lublin. They were owned by the szlachta noble families, who were supposed to answer royal call in case of an armed conflict (see Pospolite ruszenie). By the early 16th century, Poniatowa was under the authority of a Castellan from nearby Wąwolnica.

In the Polish–Lithuanian Commonwealth Poniatowa remained a village, which was part of Lublin Voivodeship. It belonged to the aristocratic Poniatowski family, which gave Poland its last king – Stanisław August Poniatowski. The family gave its name to the settlement, although by the time Poniatowskis got to prominence its members were living elsewhere. The village was in private hands until the mid-19th century, when, after the Partitions of Poland, it became part of the Russian-controlled Congress Poland. The Bull ("Ciołek" in Polish) which appears on the town's coat of arms is borrowed from one of the Poniatowskis heraldic designs.

20th century
The present town of Poniatowa was founded in the late 1930s, to house arriving workers of the new telecommunications equipment factory PZT (Zaklady Tele i Radiotechniczne - Filia nr 2), construction of which began in 1937. The factory was part of the Central Industrial Region, and was to supply radio equipment to the Polish Army. First buildings of the new town were put up in 1939, just before the outbreak of World War II and the German conquest of Poland. During the German occupation, the already erected factory was used by the Nazis to support the war effort using slave labor.

Holocaust history of PZT and Többens

In the latter half of 1941 (following Operation Barbarossa), the Germans established the first camp for the Soviet POWs on the factory grounds. By mid-1942, about 20,000 Soviet prisoners had perished there. In April 1943, during the liquidation of the Warsaw Ghetto, about 15,000 Polish Jews – mostly tailors and seamstresses – were brought to the camp where, for the next six months, they worked as forced labour in war-supply workshops owned by German war profiteer Walter Caspar Többens from Hamburg. The Poniatowa camp facilities included kitchen, medical room, a kindergarten where the children were kept while the adults and adolescents were making garments for the Wehrmacht. The entire workforce of the camp including 3,000 Slovakian and Austrian Jews (the camp elite), were executed during the Operation Harvest Festival (Aktion Erntefest) of November 4, 1943, into fake anti-aircraft trenches.

The monument in memory of the victims of the Holocaust was unveiled in Poniatowa on November 4, 2008 in the presence of the ambassador of Israel to Poland David Peleg, the ambassador of Austria, minister from the German embassy, minister from the Czech embassy, voivode of Lublin; the town's mayor, and many other officials, including Warsaw rabbi and priests.

Germans left Poniatowa in July 1944 ahead of the Soviet offensive. After the war, in 1949, the industrial development of Poniatowa resumed, with a reconstituted factory reestablished in the town.  As a result of the period of intensive growth after 1952, the town received its city charter in 1962. In its heyday, during the Communist regime, the factory employed some 5,000 workers, about half of the town's population. It produced components for refrigerators and other household appliances.  After the collapse of the Soviet empire and the subsequent free market reforms of 1989 the factory experienced economic difficulties, and in 1998 entered into bankruptcy. Presently, attempts are being made to attract new investors to take advantage of the factory's excellent infrastructure.

References

Poniatowa unofficial site (under construction)

Cities and towns in Lublin Voivodeship
Opole Lubelskie County
Lesser Poland
Lublin Governorate
Lublin Voivodeship (1919–1939)
Holocaust locations in Poland